Willem Westpalm von Hoorn Jewett (August 23, 1963 – January 12, 2022) was an American Democratic politician. He was a member of the Vermont House of Representatives from the Addison's 2nd District, being first elected in 2002. Jewett served as the Assistant House Majority Leader during the 2011–12 session and as the House Majority Leader during the 2013–14 session. He served as the Vice-Chair of House Judiciary during the 2015–16 session.

After leaving the legislature, Jewett was diagnoised with mucosal melanoma. He died from euthanasia on January 12, 2022, at the age of 58. During his life, he helped to pass a state law allowing the terminally ill to end their lives in this manner.

Jewett was born in New Rochelle, New York. He graduated from Bowdoin College and received his law degree from Lewis & Clark College. He was admitted to the Vermont bar and lived in Ripton, Vermont. He served on the Ripton School board.

References

1963 births
2022 deaths
2022 suicides
21st-century American politicians
Deaths by euthanasia
Politicians from New Rochelle, New York
People from Ripton, Vermont
Democratic Party members of the Vermont House of Representatives
School board members in Vermont
Bowdoin College alumni
Lewis & Clark College alumni
Vermont lawyers